Thiago Braga de Souza or simply Thiago Braga (born May 4, 1984 in Belo Horizonte), is a Brazilian goalkeeper who plays for Operário Ferroviário.

Contract
Ipatinga (Loan) 22 April 2006 to 31 December 2007
Cruzeiro 21 April 2006 to 20 April 2008

External links
 CBF
 Goleiro ficará cerca de 90 dias parado
 FBA

1984 births
Living people
Brazilian footballers
Cruzeiro Esporte Clube players
Ipatinga Futebol Clube players
Association football goalkeepers
Footballers from Belo Horizonte